The City Council of Dasmariñas (Filipino: Sangguniang Panglungsod ng Dasmariñas) is the legislature of the city of Dasmariñas, Cavite. It is composed of 15 members including 12 elected members, 2 ex officio members and 1 presiding officer. They are elected to serve a three-year term, with a maximum of three terms.

The ex officio members are the Association of Liga ng mga Barangay ng Dasmariñas (English: League of Barangays of Dasmariñas) President, who is currently, Antonio L. Ferrer, and the Sangguniang Kabataan (English: Youth Council) Federation President, who is currently, Jerome M. Menguito.

The vice mayor is the presiding officer of the city council. He is also the chief executive of the city whenever the mayor is out of the city. He is elected to serve a three-year term, with a maximum of three terms. The incumbent vice mayor is Rex Mangubat, incumbent since 2016.

The city council meets at the Dasmariñas City Hall.

Current members
These are the members after the 2022 local elections:

Past members

Standing committees

There are 20 standing committees in the city council each headed by a city councilor.

References

City councils in the Philippines
Politics of Dasmariñas